Gordon Hill may refer to:

People
 Gordon Hill (singer) (1927–2014), American gospel singer
 Gordon Hill (referee) (1928–2019), English football referee
 Gordon Hill (politician) (born 1951), Australian politician
 Gordon Hill (footballer) (born 1954), English football player and manager
 The Wealdstone Raider (born 1966), real name Gordon Hill, an English Internet celebrity
 Gordon Hill (American football) (born 1993), safety for the San Diego Chargers
 Gordon Hill (politician), Australian politician

Places
 Gordon Hill, London, an area in the London Borough of Enfield, United Kingdom

See also